The National Wrestling Association World Light Heavyweight Championship was a professional wrestling championship originally sanctioned by the National Boxing Association (NBA) and subsequently sanctioned by the National Wrestling Association (NWA), an offshoot of the NBA. The championship was created in 1930 and abandoned in the early 1960s.

In 1930 the NBA decided to try and regulate professional wrestling in the way they had tried to regulate boxing in the United States. One of their first steps was to try and clear up the World Championship picture in the hopes of establishing one generally recognized championship. To that end they sanctioned a number of world championship tournaments, including one for the World Light Heavyweight Championship. The NBA requested that contenders post as $2,500 forfeit to enter the tournament. Only three light heavyweights paid the forfeit, which meant that Pinki Gardner faced Joe Banaskie, and the winner of that match would face Hugh Nichols for the championship. Nichols won the bout and became the first NBA sanctioned World Light Heavyweight Champion. In September 1930 the NBA formed the National Wrestling Association to allow the organization to focus on pro wrestling. In 1948 a number of promoters joined together to form the National Wrestling Alliance, forming a network of promoters across the United States and within a year or two the Alliance would usurp the Association as the controlling organization. In 1958 then champion Frank Stojack was stripped of the Association championship due to not having defended it for a long period of time. Subsequently, the Association decided to sanction the Alliance's NWA World Light Heavyweight Championship when Dory Dixon defeated Al Kashey in a match overseen by presidents of both the National Wrestling Association and the National Wrestling Alliance. In the early 1960s the Association existed in name only, withdrawing their recognition of the Alliance championships but not sanctioning a separate championship.

Hugh Nichols was the first World Light Heavyweight Champion, winning the championship on April 4, 1940. The last officially sanctioned champion was Gory Guerrero, who won the championship on July 30, 1960. Danny McShain held the championship a total of ten times during his career, a record for most reigns. Frank Stojack's reign, lasting from August 10, 1953 until he was stripped of the championship on November 30, 1957, is the longest reign totaling 1,573 days. Danny McShain's third and seventh reign as champion only lasted seven days, although due to gaps in the championship history the possibility exists that someone else had a shorter reign.

Title history

Footnotes

See also
World Light Heavyweight Championship
World Light Heavyweight Championship (Australian version)

References

Light Heavyweight
Light heavyweight wrestling championships